Aniakchak may refer to:

Aniakchak National Monument and Preserve
Mount Aniakchak
Aniakchak River